The McBride Fire was a destructive wildfire that burned in the Lincoln National Forest near the community of Ruidoso in Lincoln County, New Mexico, in the United States as part of the 2022 New Mexico wildfire season. The fire was named after McBride Road, near where it ignited on April 12, 2022. The McBride Fire burned , and was fully contained on May 7, 2022. The official cause of the fire was determined to be a drought-stressed tree falling on power lines, which quickly ignited the dry surroundings.

Events 

The fire was first reported around 2:30 PM on Tuesday, April 12, 2022. It was driven by a period of strong winds, with gusts of up to 70 miles per hour and sustained winds of 50 to 60 miles per hour, as well as extreme dryness. These winds prevented the use of aircraft against the fire on April 12, but better conditions allowed fixed-wing aircraft, including Very Large Air Tankers (VLATs), and helicopters to help fight the blaze on subsequent days.

On April 17, all evacuations were lifted. 

On May 7, the fire was declared 100% contained.

Impacts 

Two fatalities were reported on April 13 by the New Mexico Department of Public Safety, after an elderly couple were reported missing by family members following a structure fire at their residence the day the fire started. In addition to the two deaths, the McBride Fire destroyed 207 structures, and multiple outbuildings.

References

External links 

 McBride Fire Information - InciWeb
 New Mexico Fire Information
 McBride Fire Report

2022 meteorology
Lincoln National Forest
2022 New Mexico wildfires
April 2022 events in the United States
Lincoln County, New Mexico
Wildfires in New Mexico